Tori (Tôw) is a small town and commune in the Cercle of Bankass in the Mopti Region of Mali. In 1998 the commune had a population of 10,438.

Tomo Kan is spoken in the village of Tori.

References

Communes of Mopti Region